Klavs Neerbek (born 1944) is a Danish author and gymnasium professor. He founded the electronics firm Rap Soft. Bjarner Svejgaard, who had established the Electronic Installation for Calculations at the Geodetic Institute, interested him in text processing during his early years. In 1963, he became a student of mathematics at the Østersøgade Gymnasium, where he helped edit Extra-Posta, the first school magazine in Interlingua. 

The following year, he completed his philosophicum in Boolean algebra and was an instructor in medicinal chemistry from 1966 to 1969. After becoming a candidate in chemistry, physics, and astronomy, he attended the Roskilde Cathedral School in the spring of 1970. Afterward, he was employed for nine years at the State School of Rødovre, until he became interested in computer hardware. At Tiger Data, he developed a personal computer, and in 1981, he joined ICL Computer. After two years as Professor of Physics at the Høng Gymnasium, he founded Rap Soft, a producer of educational programs for children.

Since 1992, he has served as a counselor of the Union Danese pro Interlingua (DIU), where he has combined his interest in computers and languages. In 1993, an electronic version of the Danish-Interlingua and Interlingua-Danish dictionaries appeared on disk. The publication of the disk, among the first of its kind, led to generous coverage in the professional journal Computerworld. In 1994, he headed the Interlingua Videncenter or Interlingua Knowledge Center.

References
 "Pionero del juvenes", Panorama in Interlingua, 2005, Issue 4.

Interlingua speakers
1944 births
Living people